The Paris Wine Tasting of 1976, also known as the Judgment of Paris, was a wine competition organized in Paris on 24 May 1976 by Steven Spurrier, a British wine merchant and his colleague, Patricia Gallagher, in which French judges carried out two blind tasting comparisons: one of top-quality Chardonnays and another of red wines (Bordeaux wines from France and Cabernet Sauvignon wines from Napa, California).  A Napa wine rated best in each category, which caused surprise as France was generally regarded as being the foremost producer of the world's best wines.  Spurrier sold only French wine and believed that the California wines would not win.

The event's informal name "Judgment of Paris" is an allusion to the ancient Greek myth.

The wines

Red wines

White wines

The judges

The eleven judges were (in alphabetical order):

Method
Blind tasting was performed and the judges were asked to grade each wine out of 20 points. No specific grading framework was given, leaving the judges free to grade according to their own criteria.

Rankings of the wines preferred by individual judges were based on the grades they individually attributed.

An overall ranking of the wines preferred by the jury was also established in averaging the sum of each judge's individual grades (arithmetic mean). However, grades of Patricia Gallagher and Steven Spurrier were not taken into account, thus counting only grades of French judges.

The results

White wines
California Chardonnays vs. Burgundy Chardonnays

Official jury results:

Red wines
California Cabernet Sauvignon vs. Bordeaux

Official jury results：

Average Original grades: out of 20 points.

Breakdown by judge
The original grades (out of 20 points) are shown, in alphabetical order by judge.

Pierre Brejoux
Original grades: out of 20 points.

Claude Dubois-Millot
Original grades: out of 20 points.

Michel Dovaz
Original grades: out of 20 points.

Patricia Gallagher
Original grades: out of 20 points.

Odette Kahn
Original grades: out of 20 points.

Raymond Oliver
Original grades: out of 20 points.

Steven Spurrier
Original grades: out of 20 points.

Pierre Tari
Original grades: out of 20 points.

Christian Vanneque
Original grades: out of 20 points.

Aubert de Villaine
Original grades: out of 20 points.

Jean-Claude Vrinat
Original grades: out of 20 points.

Controversies

Statistical interpretation
Orley Ashenfelter and Richard E. Quandt analyzed the results of all 11 judges instead of only nine and proposed a slightly different ranking (see below). They also stated that only the scores of the first two wines in their ranking were statistically valid, and that the seven other wines could not be differentiated statistically.

  Stag's Leap Wine Cellars '73
  Montrose '70
  Mouton '70
  Haut Brion '70
  Ridge Monte Bello '71
  Heitz Martha's '70
  Leoville-las-cases '71
  Freemark Abbey '69
  Mayacamas '71
  Clos du Val '72

Tasting replications
Some critics argued that French red wines would age better than the California reds, so this was tested.

San Francisco Wine Tasting of 1978
The San Francisco Wine Tasting of 1978 was conducted 20 months after the Paris Wine Tasting of 1976. Steven Spurrier flew in from Paris to participate in the evaluations, which were held at the Vintners Club.

On 11 January 1978, evaluators blind-tasted the same Chardonnays tasted earlier in Paris.
  – 1974 Chalone Winery
  – 1973 Chateau Montelena
  – 1973 Spring Mountain Vineyard
  – 1972 Puligny-Montrachet Les Pucelles Domaine Leflaive.
Ranking lower were Meursault Charmes Roulot 1973, Beaune Clos des Mouches Joseph Drouhin 1973, and Batard-Montrachet Ramonet-Prudhon 1973.

On 12 January 1978, evaluators blind-tasted the same Cabernet Sauvignons tasted earlier in Paris.
  – 1973 Stag's Leap Wine Cellars
  – 1970 Heitz Wine Cellars Martha's vineyard
  – 1971 Ridge Vineyards Monte Bello
  – 1970 Château Mouton Rothschild.
Ranking lower were Château Montrose 1970, Château Haut-Brion 1970, and Château Leoville Las Cases 1971.

French Culinary Institute Tasting of 1986
Two tastings were conducted by the French Culinary Institute (now called the International Culinary Center) on the tenth anniversary of the original Paris Wine Tasting. White wines were not evaluated in the belief that they were past their prime.

Steven Spurrier, who organized the original 1976 wine competition, assisted in the anniversary tasting.  Eight judges blind tasted nine of the ten wines evaluated.  The evaluation resulted in the following ranking:

Results
Rank Wine
  – Clos Du Val Winery 1972
  – Ridge Vineyards Monte Bello
  – Château Montrose
  – Château Leoville Las Cases 1971
  – Château Mouton Rothschild 1970
  – Stag's Leap Wine Cellars 1973
  – Heitz Wine Cellars 1970
  – Mayacamas Vineyards 1971
  – Château Haut-Brion

Wine Spectator Tasting of 1986
Four of the judges were experts from Wine Spectator and two were outsiders. All tasted the wines blind.

Results
Rank Wine
  – Heitz Wine Cellars 1970
  – Mayacamas Vineyards 1971
  – Ridge Vineyards Monte Bello
  – Stag's Leap Wine Cellars 1973
  – Clos Du Val Winery 1972
  – Château Montrose 1970
  – Château Mouton Rothschild 1970
  – Château Leoville Las Cases 1971
  – Freemark Abbey Winery 1969
  – Château Haut-Brion 1970

30th anniversary
A 30th anniversary re-tasting on both sides of the Atlantic Ocean was organized by Steven Spurrier in 2006. As The Times reported "Despite the French tasters, many of whom had taken part in the original tasting, 'expecting the downfall' of the American vineyards, they had to admit that the harmony of the Californian cabernets had beaten them again. Judges on both continents gave top honors to a 1971 Ridge Monte Bello cabernet. Four Californian reds occupied the next placings before the highest-ranked Bordeaux, a 1970 Château Mouton-Rothschild, came in at sixth."

The Tasting that Changed the Wine World: 'The Judgment of Paris' 30th Anniversary was conducted on 24 May 2006.

The  pearl anniversary was held simultaneously at the museum Copia in Napa, California, and in London at Berry Bros. & Rudd, Britain's oldest wine merchant.

The panel of nine wine experts at Copia consisted of Dan Berger, Anthony Dias Blue, Stephen Brook, Wilfred Jaeger, Peter Marks MW, Paul Roberts MS, Andrea Immer Robinson MS, Jean-Michel Valette MW and Christian Vanneque, one of the original judges from the 1976 tasting.

The panel of nine experts at Berry Bros. & Rudd consisted of Michel Bettane, Michael Broadbent MW, Michel Dovaz, Hugh Johnson, Matthew Jukes, Jane MacQuitty, Jasper Morris MW, Jancis Robinson OBE MW and Brian St. Pierre.

The results showed that additional panels of experts again preferred the California wines over their French competitors.

Results
   – Ridge Vineyards Monte Bello 1971
   – Stag's Leap Wine Cellars 1973
   – Mayacamas Vineyards 1971 (tie)
  – Heitz Wine Cellars 'Martha's Vineyard' 1970 (tie)
  – Clos Du Val Winery 1972
  – Château Mouton-Rothschild 1970
  – Château Montrose 1970
  – Château Haut-Brion 1970
  – Château Leoville Las Cases 1971
  – Freemark Abbey Winery 1969

Three of the Bordeaux wines in the competition were from the 1970 vintage, identified by the Conseil Interprofessionnel du Vin de Bordeaux (CIVB) as among the four best vintages in the past 45 years or more. The fourth Bordeaux was a 1971, described by the Conseil as "very good". Another official French authority, the Office national interprofessionnel des vins (Onivins), rates the 1971 vintage as "excellent".

The French wine producers had many years' experience making wine, whereas the California producers typically had only a few years' experience; the 1972 vintage was Clos Du Val's very first, yet it performed better than any of its French competitors.

Implications in the wine industry
Although Spurrier had invited many reporters to the original 1976 tasting, the only reporter to attend was George M. Taber from Time, who promptly revealed the results to the world.  The horrified and enraged leaders of the French wine industry then banned Spurrier from the nation's prestigious wine-tasting tour for a year, apparently as punishment for the damage his tasting had done to its former image of superiority. The tasting was not covered by the French press, who almost ignored the story. After nearly three months, Le Figaro published an article titled "Did the war of the cru take place?" describing the results as "laughable", and said they "cannot be taken seriously".  Six months after the tasting, Le Monde wrote a similarly toned article.

The New York Times reported that several earlier tastings had occurred in the U.S., with American chardonnays judged ahead of their French rivals. One such tasting occurred in New York just six months before the Paris tasting, but "champions of the French wines argued that the tasters were Americans with possible bias toward American wines. What is more, they said, there was always the possibility that the Burgundies had been mistreated during the long trip from the (French) wineries."  The Paris Wine Tasting of 1976 had a revolutionary impact on expanding the production and prestige of wine in the New World. It also "gave the French a valuable incentive to review traditions that were sometimes more accumulations of habit and expediency, and to reexamine convictions that were little more than myths taken on trust."

In the media
 Bottle Shock, a feature film starring Alan Rickman and Chris Pine, dramatized the 1976 wine tasting and debuted at the 2008 Sundance Film Festival. A second film (Judgment of Paris, based on George Taber's book of the same name) was in production, and there has been controversy between the makers of the two films with allegations of defamation and misrepresentation.
 Modern Marvels (S:13, E:54 – "How Wine is Made".) Discussion of the event is summarized in this History channel show.
 Hollywood screenwriter Robert Mark Kamen is filming the movie Judgment of Paris based on George Taber's book.

See also

A. W. Baxter
Mike Grgich
Warren Winiarski

References

Further reading

 Hinkle, Richard Paul. The Paris tasting revisited. Wines & Vines, August 1996, 77(8), 32–34.
 Hulkower, Neal D. The Judgment of Paris According to Borda. Journal of Wine Research, 2009, 20(3), 171–182.
 
 Peterson, Thane. The Day California Wines Came of Age: Much to France's Chagrin: a Blind Taste Test 25 Years Ago in Paris inadvertently launched California's fine wine industry. Business Week, 8 May 2001.
 
 
 Rice, William. Those winning American wines. The Washington Post, 13 June 1976.
 
 
 
 
30th anniversary
 
 

Yadegaran, Jessica. Do the French grow old gracefully? Contra Costa Times, 17 May 2006.
Yadegaran, Jessica. Napa v. Bordeaux, Round Two: Vintners re-enact famous '76 tasting. Contra Costa Times, 25 May 2006.

External links
 TIME Magazine: Modern Living: Judgement of Paris, 7 June 1976 by George M. Taber
 

30th anniversary tasting
 Paris tasting recreated for 30th anniversary
 "The Judgment of Paris: What the French didn't learn from the legendary wine-tasting." 30th anniversary article from Slate.com.

1976 in France
California wine
History of Napa County, California
French wine
History of the San Francisco Bay Area
Wine tasting
Wine-related events
1976 in California
Food and drink in the San Francisco Bay Area
May 1976 events in Europe